Conrad "Conny" Andersson (born 28 December 1939 in Alingsås, Sweden) is a Swedish former racing driver who participated in Formula One during  and  for the Surtees and BRM teams.

Prior to his Formula One career, Andersson was a motocross rider and competed in Formula 3 racing as a privateer for almost ten years, obtaining a lot of success. He won the 1974 Swedish Formula 3 Championship, and in 1975 he competed in the European Formula 3 Championship, where he won at Monaco and the following season won four more races.

Complete Formula One results
(key)

References

External links
Profile at grandprix.com

1939 births
Living people
Swedish racing drivers
Swedish Formula One drivers
Surtees Formula One drivers
BRM Formula One drivers
FIA European Formula 3 Championship drivers
People from Alingsås

Swedish Formula Three Championship drivers